XIII is the thirteenth studio album by the Norwegian hard rock band TNT, released on 8 June 2018. It is the first and only TNT album with the band's fourth lead vocalist Baol Bardot Bulsara, who officially joined in November 2017.

Track listing

Personnel 
TNT
Baol Bardot Bulsara – lead vocals
Ronni Le Tekrø – guitars
Ove Husemoen – bass
Diesel Dahl – drums

Charts

References

2018 albums
TNT (Norwegian band) albums
Frontiers Records albums